Qaleh Gol (also Romanized as Qal‘eh Gol; also known as Qal‘eh Kol) is a village in Chubar Rural District, Ahmadsargurab District, Shaft County, Gilan Province, Iran. At the 2006 census, its population was 20, in 5 families.

References 

Populated places in Shaft County